Sound of Pig was a cassette culture label started in 1984 by Al Margolis in New York City. The label released hundreds of original cassettes between 1984 and 1990. It featured Margolis' own audio art projects that he recorded under the name of If, Bwana plus a large number of national and international noise music artists.

Footnotes

Music publications
Culture of New York City
Experimental music record labels
Industrial record labels
American record labels
Music organizations based in the United States
Cassette culture 1970s–1990s